Prima Donnas is a Philippine television drama series broadcast by GMA Network. Its first season aired on the network's Afternoon Prime line up and worldwide via GMA Pinoy TV from August 19, 2019 to February 19, 2021 replacing Bihag. Its second season aired from January 24 to April 30, 2022 replacing Las Hermanas.

NUTAM (Nationwide Urban Television Audience Measurement) People in Television Homes ratings are provided by AGB Nielsen Philippines.

Series overview

Episodes

Season 1 (2019–2021)

Season 2 (2022)

References

Lists of Philippine drama television series episodes